Nicolas Alejandro Cinalli (born 6 July 1979) is a former Argentine professional footballer who plays as a goalkeeper.

Career
Born in Rosario, Cinalli played youth football with Colegio Salesiano San Jose and Central Córdoba, before turning professional with the latter in 1999. After one season he moved to Italy, spending a number of years in the lower leagues (Serie B, C1, C2 and D) with teams such as Virtus Entella, Varese, Ragusa, Crotone, Potenza, Genzano and played one season in the Italian Serie "A" (2001–2002) with Perugia before moving to the Netherlands Eredivisie in 2007, to sign for De Graafschap. Cinalli spent two seasons with De Graafschap, making one league appearance.

He ended his career in Argentina playing for Atletico Policial, El Porvenir del Norte and Sportivo Las Parejas in the Torneo Argentino "B".

References

1979 births
Living people
Argentine people of Italian descent
Argentine footballers
Association football goalkeepers
A.C. Perugia Calcio players
S.S.D. Varese Calcio players
F.C. Crotone players
De Graafschap players
Eredivisie players
Argentine expatriate footballers
Expatriate footballers in Italy
Argentine expatriate sportspeople in Italy
Expatriate footballers in the Netherlands
Argentine expatriate sportspeople in the Netherlands
Footballers from Rosario, Santa Fe